James Watson Kernohan, M.D. (1896–1981) was an Irish-American pathologist born October 1, 1896 in County Antrim, Ireland. He studied medicine at Queen's University Belfast, and in 1922 he emigrated to the United States and subsequently worked as a pathologist at the Mayo Clinic in Rochester, Minnesota. Kernohan retired from active medical practice in 1962 and died May 5, 1981.

Kernohan is remembered for his work in neuropathology, particularly research of spinal cord tumors, brain abscesses and metastatic brain lesions. He is credited with developing a widely used classification system for brain tumors. The eponymous Kernohan's notch is named after him, which is a groove in the cerebral peduncle caused by displacement of the brainstem against the incisura of the tentorium cerebelli in some cases of transtentorial herniation.

In 1952 he published an atlas of tumor pathology titled Tumors of the Central Nervous System, and with Mayo neurosurgeon Alfred Uihlein (1908–1990) he published Sarcomas of the Brain.

References

  European Neurology; Kernohan's Notch J.M.S.Pearce
 1930 United States Census, Rochester, Olmsted County, Minnesota.
 Minnesota Death Index, 1908-2002, Certificate No. 012459, Record No. 2044236.

1896 births
1981 deaths
American pathologists
Irish emigrants to the United States (before 1923)